The 1965–66 Allsvenskan was the 32nd season of the top division of Swedish handball. 10 teams competed in the league. IS Göta won the league and claimed their first Swedish title. KFUM Borås and IF Hallby were relegated.

League table

References 

Swedish handball competitions